Juan Cruz González (born 1 October 1992) is an Argentine rugby union player, currently playing for the Toronto Arrows of Major League Rugby (MLR). His preferred position is fly-half or fullback.

Professional career
González signed for Major League Rugby side Toronto Arrows ahead of the 2021 Major League Rugby season. He had previously represented Argentina Sevens at two competitions in 2016.

References

External links
itsrugby.co.uk Profile

1992 births
Living people
Argentine rugby union players
Rugby union fly-halves
Rugby union fullbacks
Toronto Arrows players